Robert Dwayne Gruss (born June 25, 1955) is an American prelate of the Roman Catholic Church. He has served as the seventh bishop of the Diocese of Saginaw in Michigan since 2019. Gruss previously served as the bishop of the Diocese of Rapid City in South Dakota from 2011-2019.

Biography

Early life 
Robert Gruss was born in Texarkana, Arkansas on June 25, 1955. He has an associate degree from Madison Area Technical College in Madison, Wisconsin. He earned his commercial pilot license from the Spartan School of Aeronautics in Tulsa, Oklahoma, and worked as a flight instructor and commercial pilot from 1980 to 1989.

Gruss began his studies for the priesthood at St. Ambrose University in Davenport, Iowa where he earned a Bachelor of Theology degree in 1990. He earned a Bachelor of Sacred Theology degree in 1993 and a Master in Spiritual Theology degree in 1994 from the Pontifical University of Saint Thomas Aquinas in Rome, Italy.

Priesthood 
Gruss was ordained a priest for the Diocese of Davenport by Bishop William Franklin at Sacred Heart Cathedral in Davenport on July 2, 1994.After his ordination, Gruss served as parochial vicar of St. Paul the Apostle Parish in Davenport, Iowa from 1994 to 1997. He served in the same role for three parishes in central Iowa from 1997 to 1998;

 St. Anthony in Knoxville
 Sacred Heart in Melcher
 St. Mary in Pella. He then served as the pastor in Pella from 1999 to 2004.

Gruss was the diocesan vocations director from 2004 to 2007, and diocesan chancellor from 2005 to 2007. Pope Benedict XVI named him a chaplain of his holiness, with the title of monsignor, in August 2007. Gruss served as the vice-rector of the Pontifical North American College in Rome from 2007 to 2010. From 2010 to 2011, he served as pastor and rector of Sacred Heart Cathedral Parish in Davenport.

Bishop of Rapid City 
Gruss was named the bishop of the Diocese of Rapid City by Benedict XVI on May 26, 2011. His episcopal consecration took place on July 28, 2011, at the Rushmore Plaza Civic Center in Rapid City, South Dakota. Archbishop John Nienstedt was the consecrating bishop, and Bishops Martin Amos and Samuel Aquila were the co-consecrators. 

In 2017, Gruss opened the cause for the canonization of Lakota medicine man Nicholas Black Elk.

Bishop of Saginaw 

Gruss was named the bishop of the Diocese of Saginaw by Pope Francis on May 24, 2019.  In remarks to the media, Gruss made this statement about sexual abuse by priests:“There is no place in the church for sexual abuse of minors or anyone else, My desire is that the Church becomes holy in the way that Christ calls her to be, and those who abuse their power and authority are held to accountability.”Gruss was installed on July 26, 2019.

See also

 Catholic Church hierarchy
 Catholic Church in the United States
 Historical list of the Catholic bishops of the United States
 List of Catholic bishops of the United States
 Lists of patriarchs, archbishops, and bishops

References

External links

 Roman Catholic Diocese of Saginaw Official Site 
 Roman Catholic Diocese of Rapid City Official Site 

1955 births
Living people
People from Texarkana, Arkansas
People from Tulsa, Oklahoma
People from Madison, Wisconsin
People from Davenport, Iowa
Madison Area Technical College alumni
St. Ambrose University alumni
Pontifical North American College alumni
Pontifical University of Saint Thomas Aquinas alumni
21st-century Roman Catholic bishops in the United States
Roman Catholic Diocese of Davenport
Roman Catholic bishops of Rapid City
Roman Catholic bishops of Saginaw
Catholics from Wisconsin
Catholics from Oklahoma
Catholics from Iowa
Catholics from Arkansas